IAB meteorites are a group of iron meteorites according to their overall composition and a group of primitive achondrites because of silicate inclusions that show a strong affinity to winonaites and chondrites.

Description
The IAB meteorites are composed of meteoric iron (kamacite and taenite) and silicate inclusions. Structurally they can be hexahedrites, fine to coarse octahedrites, or even ataxites. Most of them are octahedrite with medium to coarse taenite-lamella and distinct Widmanstätten patterning.

The silicate inclusions are composed of low-Ca pyroxene, high-Ca pyroxene, olivine, plagioclase, troilite, graphite, different phosphates, meteoric iron and traces of  daubréelite and chromite. This composition is very similar to the composition of winonaites, and it is therefore argued that the two groups share the same parent body. There are also similarities with the IIICD meteorites, but it is not yet clear whether they are also part of that parent body.

Classification
The IAB group was created from the older IA and IB groups. Some authors also prefer to call it IAB complex.

There are numerous subdivisions of the IAB group:

IAB main group
sLL subgroup
sLM subgroup (originally IIIC)
sLH subgroup (originally IIID)
sHL subgroup
sHH subgroup (includes Gay Gulch trio)
Udei Station grouplet
Pitts grouplet
Algarrabo duo
Mundrabilla duo
Britstown duo
NWA 468 duo
Twin City duo
solo irons related to IAB
IAB related?

Parent body
Most scientists believe that the winonaites and the IAB meteorites share the same parent body. It is not yet fully understood whether the IIICD meteorites also belong to that body.

Notable specimen
Canyon Diablo
Pitts meteorite (part of Pitts grouplet)
Udei station meteorite (part of Udei station grouplet)
Goose Lake Meteorite
Monturaqui
Nantan meteorite

See also
 Glossary of meteoritics

References

Achondrite meteorites